Piers Wenger is a British television executive who serves as controller of BBC drama commissioning.

Early life
Wenger was born Piers John Wenger in Stoke-on-Trent, Staffordshire, England on 29 June 1972.

Career
Wenger was appointed as controller of BBC drama commissioning in 2016, after four years as head of drama at Channel 4. Prior to Channel 4, he was head of drama at BBC Wales and an executive producer on Doctor Who. As a producer, he closely collaborated with Victoria Wood over a decade on her dramatic projects. He produced her BAFTA and RTS award-winning dramatization of Nella Last's diary Housewife, 49, collaborated with her on Loving Miss Hatto, Wood's dramatization of the life of classical pianist Joyce Hatto and co-executive produced Eric and Ernie, Peter Bowker's biopic of the young Morecambe and Wise in which Wood also starred.

In his time at Channel 4, he managed a number of popular dramas. In February 2015, Indian Summers, a period drama chronicling the last years of British imperial rule in India launched and recorded the highest overnight drama audience for a Channel 4 drama in 20 years. No Offence, Paul Abbott's anarchic police procedural, launched strongly later in the same year and won the Royal Television Society Award for best drama series. Humans, Sam Vincent and Jonathan Brackley's sci-fi series, a co-production with AMC, became a significant ratings hit, breaking the record set by Indian Summers earlier in the year.

In his first stint at the BBC, he was responsible for commissioning Tom Stoppard's Parade's End and Kevin Elyot's dramatization of the life of Christopher Isherwood, Christopher and His Kind.

In 2021, as the BBC's Head of Drama, Wenger confirmed that he had reluctantly backed a decision to discontinue the long-running hospital drama Holby City in favour of the return of Waterloo Road, one representing the north of Britain.

Credits
Producer
Housewife, 49 (2006)
Ballet Shoes (2007)
Executive Producer
The Sarah Jane Adventures (2009)
Doctor Who (2010–2011)
Upstairs, Downstairs (2010)
Eric and Ernie (2011)

References

External links

Lonely hearts, The Observer, 13 February 2005

1972 births
Living people
BBC executives
Place of birth missing (living people)
British television producers